Andy Baio is an American technologist and blogger. He is the co-founder of the XOXO Festival, founder of Upcoming.org, a former CTO of Kickstarter and the author of the Waxy.org blog.

Career 
In 2003, Baio launched Upcoming, a collaborative event calendar.  The site was acquired by Yahoo for an undisclosed sum in 2005 and Baio joined the company as the site's Technical Director. In 2007, Baio announced his departure from Yahoo.

In September 2008, Baio joined the board of directors of Kickstarter, a crowdfunding website that helps people with project ideas to connect with potential funders. Baio later joined the staff as Chief Technical Officer in July 2009, stepping down in November 2010 to join Expert Labs. In June 2017, Baio joined Fuzzco as Technology Director.

After Yahoo offered to sell the Upcoming domain back to Baio, he launched a Kickstarter campaign that hit its $30,000 goal in May 2014 to revive the site.

Media 
Baio was involved in the dissemination of the Star Wars Kid video, which depicted teenager Ghyslain Raza clumsily emulating martial arts moves for the camera. In response to the negative attention the boy received, Baio and another blogger, Jish Mukerji, organized a fundraiser which gathered up $1,000 from about 100 donors. In March 2022, Baio met Raza and apologised to him for posting the video. Raza accepted his apology.

When the parody cartoon House of Cosbys was taken down from its original site due to a cease and desist letter from Bill Cosby's attorney, Baio placed the videos on his own website. Baio later received a similar cease and desist letter but refused to comply, citing fair use and decrying what he termed "a special kind of discrimination against amateur creators on the Internet", since Cosby had often been parodied in the mainstream media. In 2009, he produced Kind of Bloop, a chiptune tribute album commemorating the 50th anniversary of Miles Davis' Kind of Blue. The album's cover was a pixel art version of the original album's cover, which consisted of a photograph taken by Jay Maisel. Attorneys representing Maisel demanded damages and that the resulting image be removed from the chiptune album, resulting in a settlement of $32,500 from Baio.

Baio has also written for Wired magazine and The New York Times, and was a staffer on R. U. Sirius' online magazine GettingIt.com. Baio coined the term supercut in 2008, which in 2017 became known through the song "Supercut" by singer Lorde.

In early 2012, Baio and Andy McMillan co-founded the XOXO Festival, celebrating independent artists and technologists. The conference has been held in Portland, Oregon, since 2012. The conferences have been largely funded via prepaid tickets and other contributions, including via Kickstarter.

References

External links 

 Official site – main blog
 Kind of Bloop

American bloggers
1977 births
Living people